Orlando Fernando Chavarria (born 31 July 1971) is a Belizean former cyclist. He competed in the team time trial at the 1992 Summer Olympics.

References

External links
 

1971 births
Living people
Belizean male cyclists
Cyclists at the 1994 Commonwealth Games
Commonwealth Games competitors for Belize
Olympic cyclists of Belize
Cyclists at the 1992 Summer Olympics
Place of birth missing (living people)